Trying to Get Somewhere is the fifth and final release by Canadian indie rock band Shotgun & Jaybird, released in 2006 on Sappy Records.

Track listing
 "3 1 8 6 4 2 9 7 5"
 "Two and Two is Four"
 "Writing on Our Arms"
 "Come Back Slowly"
 "Borrowed Mini-Vans"
 "Low Tide Phobia"
 "Lovers of the World Be on Time Tonight"
 "Cabin Fever"
 "Head Security Guard Surveys the Ground Around Him"
 "Re:tired"
 "Pidgeon"

Critical reception
Vish Khanna of Exclaim! Magazine said Trying to Get Somewhere was an unplanned "powerful, inspiring record".

References

2006 albums
Shotgun & Jaybird albums